Eranthis is a genus of eight species of flowering plants in the buttercup family Ranunculaceae, native to southern Europe and east across Asia to Japan. The common name winter aconite comes from the early flowering time and the resemblance of the leaves to those of the related genus Aconitum, the true aconite. Like the notoriously toxic Aconitum (and, indeed, many other genera of the Ranunculaceae) Eranthis is poisonous, although its chemistry is different, the toxic compounds present being mainly cardiac glycosides of the bufadienolide group similar to those found in Adonis vernalis, rather than the virulent alkaloids of Aconitum.

The flowers are yellow (white in E. albiflora and E. pinnatifida), and among the first to appear in spring, as early as January in mild climates, though later where winter snowpack persists; they are frost-tolerant and readily survive fresh snow cover unharmed. The leaves only expand fully when the flowers are nearly finished; they are peltate, 5–8 cm diameter, with several notches, and only last for 2–3 months before dying down during the late spring.

Species in this genus are spring ephemerals, growing on forest floors and using the sunshine available below the canopy of deciduous trees before the leaves come out; the leaves die off when the shade from tree canopies becomes dense, or, in dry areas, when summer drought reduces water availability.

They are popular ornamental plants grown for their winter or early spring flowering. E. hyemalis is widely naturalised in northern Europe and North America.

Species 
Eranthis albiflora. Western China.
Eranthis cilicica. Southwestern Asia.
Eranthis hyemalis. Southern Europe.
Eranthis lobulata. Western China.
Eranthis longistipitata. Central Asia.
Eranthis pinnatifida. Japan.
Eranthis sibirica. Northern Asia.
Eranthis stellata. Eastern Asia (northern China, Korea, southeast Russia).
Eranthis byunsanensis. South Korea

Gallery

See also
 Aconitum
 Aconitine

References

External links 

Flora of China: Eranthis

Ranunculaceae
Ranunculaceae genera